Perversidade is a 1921 Brazilian short film comedy directed by José Medina. The film was premiered on 27 October 1921, in Rio de Janeiro.

Cast
Inocência Colado   
Regina Fuína   
Maria Fuína   
Carlos Ferreira   
José Medina   
José Vassalo Jr.   
Francisco Madrigano   
Nicola Tartaglione

External links
 

1921 films
Brazilian black-and-white films
Brazilian silent short films
1921 comedy films
1921 short films
Comedy short films
Brazilian comedy films
Silent comedy films